Peter Gibson (born April 14, 1971, in Greenwich, Connecticut) is an American writer.

He is the third of five children: Robert Christian Gibson Jr. (nicknamed, Gibby), Paula Elizabeth Gibson, Jeffrey Michael Gibson & Michael Patrick Gibson. His older siblings, Gibby  & Paula, along with his mother, Paula Kathryn Ivanovich, were involved in various Broadway productions, this gave him the inspiration and opportunity to pursue a career in show business. Growing up a child actor/model he appeared in various commercials, films and plays.

He attended Arizona State University, Fairfield University and New York University, where he concentrated his studies in Chaos Theory. He left his academic studies to pursue acting in New York City, having some success. He starred in American Intellectuals with Shawnee Free Jones, Andrew Lauren, Portia de Rossi and Alex Martin. He left NYC, for Los Angeles and re-directed his talents to concentrate on writing and producing, film and television. The first feature he wrote and produced was Free, starring Corin Nemec, Randall Batinkoff and Ione Skye. He has written, produced and directed various short films including Mr. BBQ starring Shawnee Free Jones and Ori Mace which won the Stockholm film festival. He was head of production for the Eugene Chaplin and Kiera Chaplin where he oversaw all stages of production. He created the television shows Skavengers, "Munch Kidz", and "Campus Cuisine."

He was a dancer on Club MTV, appeared on seven episodes of the Family Feud, and was a Fireman in Greenwich, CT. He is a classically trained chef, Le Cordon Bleu, who teaches children how to cook. He currently resides in Los Angeles, with his dog Chloe, where he continues to pursue the arts.

Filmography 

Couples Therapy (short) – Writer, Producer (2010)
Ornaments – Producer (2008)
Farm Girl in New York – "Very Special Thanks" (2007)
Kill Your Darlings – "Very Special Thanks" (2006)
The Girl – Producer (2004)
Mr. BBQ (short) – Writer, Producer, director, Cinematographer (2002)
Free – Gibby, Writer, Producer (2001)
American Intellectuals – Parker (1999)

Past Television 

Campus Cuisine (TV Series) – Writer (created by), Producer, Host (2012)
Girl NeXXXt Door (TV Pilot) – Writer (created by), Producer (2006)
 Munch Kidz (TV movie) – Writer, Executive Producer (2004)
 Skavengers (TV movie) – Writer (created by), Executive Producer, Director (2004)
Beverly Hills, 90210 (1999) playing "Eric" in You Better Work (episode # 10.3)

References

External links
 
 
 

American male actors
Arizona State University alumni
Fairfield University alumni
New York University alumni
American male writers
American television producers
Living people
1971 births
Film producers from Arizona